Christopher André d'Entremont  (born October 31, 1969) is a Canadian politician who has represented West Nova in the House of Commons since 2019, as a member of the Conservative Party. Before entering federal politics, he represented the Argyle-Barrington in the Nova Scotia House of Assembly from 2003 to 2019 as a member of the Nova Scotia Progressive Conservatives. D'Entremont was elected the deputy speaker and chair of Committees of the Whole in 2021 on a secret ballot. He is the first person of Acadian descent to serve as deputy speaker and the first Nova Scotian deputy speaker of the House of Commons of Canada since 1916.

Before politics
Before his election in 2003, d'Entremont worked as an announcer at CJLS-FM. Later, he was employed by TriStar Industries, as an electronics salesperson and then for Camille d'Eon Boatbuilders. He was also a development officer for the South West Shore Development Authority.

Political career

Provincial politics
D'Entremont was first elected MLA for Argyle in the 2003 election, and re-elected in the 2006, 2009, 2013 and 2017 elections. On August 15, 2003, d'Entremont was appointed to the Executive Council of Nova Scotia as Minister of Agriculture and Fisheries, and Minister of Acadian Affairs.  He later served as Minister of Health, Minister of Community Services, Minister responsible for the Youth Secretariat, and Chair of the Senior Citizens' Secretariat. He briefly served as the interim Minister of Finance prior to the death of Michael Baker on March 2, 2009. Those duties were shifted to Jamie Muir on March 10, 2009.

On November 20, 2018, d'Entremont announced he was seeking the Conservative nomination in West Nova for the 2019 federal election. He won the nomination on June 22, 2019. d'Entremont resigned his provincial seat on July 31, 2019.

Federal politics
On October 21, 2019, d'Entremont was elected as the Member of Parliament in West Nova. He defeated Liberal candidate Jason Deveau to win the seat (the incumbent MP, Liberal Colin Fraser, did not seek re-election), becoming the only non-Liberal MP from Nova Scotia and representing the easternmost riding among Conservatives elected in the 2019 federal election.

In 2019, Conservative leader Andrew Scheer appointed d'Entremont to be Shadow Minister of Official Languages and a member of the Standing Committee on Official Languages. He served as Shadow Minister for Intergovernmental Affairs in Erin O'Toole's Shadow Cabinet. D'Entremont also sat as a member of the Standing Committee on Health.

On September 20, 2021, d'Entremont was re-elected as the Member of Parliament for West Nova.

Personal life
He married Anne d'Entremont (née Muise) on May 20, 1995 in Ste. Anne du Ruisseau, Nova Scotia. They have two sons: André (b. 1998) and Alec (b. 2002).

Electoral record

Federal

He won re-election in 2021 by 19%.

Provincial

|-

|Progressive Conservative
|Chris d'Entremont
|align="right"| 4,031
|align="right"| 65.08
|align="right"| +10.39
|-

|Liberal
|Louis d'Entremont
|align="right"| 1,840
|align="right"| 29.71
|align="right"| -10.67
|-

|New Democratic Party
|Greg Foster
|align="right"| 323
|align="right"| 5.21
|align="right"| +0.28
|}

|-

|Progressive Conservative
|Chris d'Entremont
|align="right"| 3,935
|align="right"| 54.69
|align="right"| -9.45
|-

|Liberal
|Kent Blades
|align="right"| 2,905
|align="right"| 40.38
|align="right"| +23.49
|-

|New Democratic Party
|Kenn Baynton
|align="right"| 355
|align="right"| 4.93
|align="right"| -12.35
|}

|-

|Progressive Conservative
|Chris d'Entremont
|align="right"|2,817
|align="right"|64.14
|align="right"|-3.51
|-
 
|New Democratic Party
|Melvin Huskins
|align="right"|759
|align="right"|17.28
|align="right"|+5.90
|-

|-

|}

|-

|Progressive Conservative
|Chris d'Entremont
|align="right"|3,158
|align="right"|67.65
|align="right"|+19.70
|-

|-
 
|New Democratic Party
|Charles Muise
|align="right"|531
|align="right"|11.38
|align="right"|-0.79
|-

|}

|-

|Progressive Conservative
|Chris d'Entremont
|align="right"|2,345
|align="right"|47.95
|align="right"|-29.06
|-

|-
 
|New Democratic Party
|Charles Muise
|align="right"|595
|align="right"|12.17
|align="right"|+5.66
|}

References

External links
 Chris d'Entremont's official website
 PC caucus profile

1969 births
Acadian people
Conservative Party of Canada MPs
Living people
Members of the Executive Council of Nova Scotia
Nova Scotia Ministers of Health
Progressive Conservative Association of Nova Scotia MLAs
People from Yarmouth, Nova Scotia
21st-century Canadian politicians
Finance ministers of Nova Scotia
Members of the House of Commons of Canada from Nova Scotia